The 2020 Sydney Women's Sevens was the fifth tournament within the 2019–20 World Rugby Women's Sevens Series and the fourth edition of the Australian Women's Sevens. It was held over the first weekend of February 2020 at Bankwest Stadium in Sydney and was run alongside the men's tournament.

In the final, New Zealand claimed their fourth tournament victory in a row as they defeated Canada 33–7.

Format
The teams were drawn into three pools of four teams each. Each team played every other team in their pool once. The top team from each pool and the best second-placed team advanced to the semifinals to playoff for berths in the cup final and third place match. The other teams from each group were paired off for the lower classification matches.

Teams
There were twelve national women's teams in the tournament, the eleven core teams for the series plus Japan as the invited side.

Pool stage

Pool A

Pool B

Pool C

Placement matches

Eleventh place

Ninth place

Seventh place

Fifth place

Knockout stage

Tournament placings

Source: World Rugby

See also
 World Rugby Women's Sevens Series
 2019–20 World Rugby Women's Sevens Series
 2020 Sydney Sevens

References

External links
 Tournament site
 World Rugby info

2020
2019–20 World Rugby Women's Sevens Series
2020 in Australian women's sport
2020 in women's rugby union
2020 in Australian rugby union
February 2020 sports events in Australia